Callum McBrierty is a British rower.

Career 

McBrierty competed for Durham University Boat Club as a student.

Alongside Oliver Cook and cox Henry Fieldman, McBrierty took Gold in the men's coxed pair at the 2016 World Championships in Rotterdam.

References

1992 births
Living people
British male rowers
Durham University Boat Club rowers
Alumni of St John's College, Durham
World Rowing Championships medalists for Great Britain